Lavochnoye is a rural locality (a selo) in Krasnoyarsky Selsoviet, Ufimsky District, Bashkortostan, Russia. The population was 2 as of 2010. There is 1 street.

Geography 
Lavochnoye is located 20 km north of Ufa (the district's administrative centre) by road. Tarbeyevka is the nearest rural locality.

References 

Rural localities in Ufimsky District